The Protocol for Limiting and Regulating the Cultivation of the Poppy Plant, the Production of, International and Wholesale Trade in, and Use of Opium, signed on 23 June 1953 in New York City, was a drug control treaty, promoted by Harry J. Anslinger, with the purpose of imposing stricter controls on opium production.

Article 6 of the treaty limited opium production to seven countries. Article 2 stated that Parties were required to "limit the use of opium exclusively to medical and scientific needs". It did not receive sufficient ratifications to enter into force until 1963, by which time it had been superseded by the 1961 Single Convention on Narcotic Drugs.

References
 Cannabis: Our Position for a Canadian Public Policy, Report of the Senate Special Committee on Illegal Drugs, September 2002.

External links
 Signatures and ratifications .

Protocol for Limiting and Regulating the Cultivation of the Poppy Plant, the Production of, International and Wholesale Trade in, and Use of Opium
Drug control treaties
United Nations treaties
Treaties concluded in 1953
Treaties entered into force in 1963
Treaties of Argentina
Treaties of Australia
Treaties of Belgium
Treaties of the Second Brazilian Republic
Treaties of the Kingdom of Cambodia (1953–1970)
Treaties of Cameroon
Treaties of Canada
Treaties of the Central African Republic
Treaties of Chile
Treaties of the Republic of China (1949–1971)
Treaties of the Republic of the Congo
Treaties of Ivory Coast
Treaties of Cuba
Treaties of the Republic of the Congo (Léopoldville)
Treaties of Denmark
Treaties of the Dominican Republic
Treaties of Ecuador
Treaties of the Republic of Egypt (1953–1958)
Treaties of El Salvador
Treaties of the French Fourth Republic
Treaties of West Germany
Treaties of the Kingdom of Greece
Treaties of Guatemala
Treaties of India
Treaties of Indonesia
Treaties of Pahlavi Iran
Treaties of Israel
Treaties of Italy
Treaties of Japan
Treaties of Jordan
Treaties of Liechtenstein
Treaties of Luxembourg
Treaties of Madagascar
Treaties of Monaco
Treaties of Nicaragua
Treaties of Niger
Treaties of the Dominion of Pakistan
Treaties of Panama
Treaties of Papua New Guinea
Treaties of Paraguay
Treaties of the Philippines
Treaties of South Korea
Treaties of Rwanda
Treaties of Senegal
Treaties of the Union of South Africa
Treaties of Francoist Spain
Treaties of the Dominion of Ceylon
Treaties of Sweden
Treaties of Switzerland
Treaties of Turkey
Treaties of the United States
1953 in New York City
Treaties extended to Norfolk Island
Treaties extended to the Belgian Congo
Treaties extended to Ruanda-Urundi
Treaties extended to the Cook Islands
Treaties extended to Niue
Treaties extended to Tokelau
Treaties extended to the Faroe Islands
Treaties extended to Greenland
Treaties extended to American Samoa
Treaties extended to Baker Island
Treaties extended to Guam
Treaties extended to Howland Island
Treaties extended to Jarvis Island
Treaties extended to Johnston Atoll
Treaties extended to Midway Atoll
Treaties extended to Navassa Island
Treaties extended to the Trust Territory of the Pacific Islands
Treaties extended to Palmyra Atoll
Treaties extended to Puerto Rico
Treaties extended to the United States Virgin Islands
Treaties extended to Wake Island
Treaties extended to the Panama Canal Zone
Treaties extended to the Nauru Trust Territory
Treaties extended to the Territory of Papua and New Guinea
Treaties extended to the Western Samoa Trust Territory
Treaties extended to South West Africa
Treaties extended to French Guiana
Treaties extended to Clipperton Island
Treaties extended to French Algeria
Treaties extended to French Cameroon
Treaties extended to French Comoros
Treaties extended to French Equatorial Africa
Treaties extended to French India
Treaties extended to French Indochina
Treaties extended to the French Protectorate of Tunisia
Treaties extended to French Morocco
Treaties extended to French Polynesia
Treaties extended to French Somaliland
Treaties extended to the French Southern and Antarctic Lands
Treaties extended to French Togoland
Treaties extended to French West Africa
Treaties extended to Guadeloupe
Treaties extended to French Madagascar
Treaties extended to Martinique
Treaties extended to Mayotte
Treaties extended to New Caledonia
Treaties extended to the New Hebrides
Treaties extended to Réunion
Treaties extended to Saint Pierre and Miquelon
Treaties extended to Wallis and Futuna
Treaties extended to West Berlin